Achilles and the Tortoise are a pair of characters that appear in Zeno's paradoxes.

Achilles and the Tortoise may also refer to:

What the Tortoise Said to Achilles by Lewis Carroll
Gödel, Escher, Bach by Douglas Hofstadter 
Achilles and the Tortoise (film), a Japanese film starring Takeshi Kitano